"Niemand sonst" ("No one else") is a song by the German singer Yvonne Catterfeld, recorded for her first album Meine Welt (2003). It was written by Götz von Sydow and Ralf Hildenbeutel and produced by the latter with Matthias Hoffmann and Steffen Britzke under their production name Schallbau. A mid-tempo pop soul track with slight elements of the contemporary R&B genre, it was the second single to precede Meine Welt and reached number 31 on the German Singles Chart.

Music video
The music video for "Niemand sonst" was directed by Robert Bröllochs.

Formats and track listings

Charts

Weekly charts

References

External links
 Yvonne Catterfeld official website

2002 singles
2002 songs
Yvonne Catterfeld songs
Hansa Records singles